The 12857 / 58 Tamralipta Express is an Superfast  train belonging to Indian Railways South Eastern Railway zone that runs between  and  in India.

It operates as train number 12857 from Howrah Junction to Digha and as train number 12858 in the reverse direction, serving the states of  West Bengal.

Background
This train is given on the name of Tamralipta which it was the name of a city in ancient India, located on the Bay of Bengal. The Tamluk town in present-day West Bengal is identified as the site of Tamralipti or Tamralipta.

Coaches
The 12857 / 58 Tamralipta Express has 1 AC chair car, 6 Chair car, seven general unreserved & two SLR (seating with luggage rake) coaches. It carries a pantry car.

As is customary with most train services in India, coach composition may be amended at the discretion of Indian Railways depending on demand.

Service

Routing
The 12857 / 58 Tamralipta Express runs from Howrah Junction via , Tamluk, Kanthi, Ramnagar to Digha.

Schedule

12857 

Runs daily

12858 

Runs daily

RSA

22897 / 98 Kandari Express

Traction
As the route is electrified, a Santragachi-based WAP-4 electric locomotive pulls the train to its destination.

References

External links
12857 Tamralipta Express at India Rail Info
12858 Tamralipta Express at India Rail Info

Named passenger trains of India
Rail transport in Howrah
Rail transport in West Bengal
Transport in Digha
Express trains in India